Robert Eddins (October 11, 1988 – December 20, 2016) was an American football linebacker. He was signed by the Buffalo Bills as an undrafted free agent in 2011 after playing college football for Ball State University.

Early life
Eddins graduated from Crockett High School in Detroit, playing under coach Rod Oden.

Professional career

Buffalo Bills
After going undrafted in the 2011 NFL Draft, Eddins signed as a free agent with the Buffalo Bills. He was placed on the injured reserve list on September 14, and waived with an injury settlement on September 20. He was signed by the Bills to their practice squad on November 30.

On January 6, 2012, Eddins was again signed by the Buffalo Bills. While making a rise up the depth chart in that summer's training camp, on August 21 in the Rochester newspaper Democrat and Chronicle, Eddins was quoted as saying "Being inconsistent makes you non-existent". In total Eddins played in one regular season game during the 2011 season and four preseason games. He played in four preseason games in 2012.

Canadian Football League
After his NFL career Eddins went to Canada and joined the Saskatchewan Roughriders during the 2014 CFL preseason. During training camp he injured his hamstring. He was cut on June 22, 2014.

Death
Eddins was found dead on December 20, 2016, in Detroit, Michigan while police were investigating a double homicide.
On February 22, 2018, the FBI announced that 3 drug dealers had been arrested for Eddins' murder, about 1 and a half years later.

See also
 List of homicides in Michigan

References

External links
 NFL profile

1988 births
2016 deaths
American football linebackers
Ball State Cardinals football players
Buffalo Bills players
Deaths by firearm in Michigan
Male murder victims
Players of American football from Detroit
Saskatchewan Roughriders players
Crockett High School (Michigan) alumni
American murder victims
People murdered in Michigan